The 2014 Internazionali di Tennis Città di Vicenza was a professional tennis tournament played on clay courts. It was the first edition of the tournament which was part of the 2014 ATP Challenger Tour. It took place in Vicenza, Italy between 26 May and 1 June 2014.

Singles main-draw entrants

Seeds

 1 Rankings are as of May 19, 2014.

Other entrants
The following players received wildcards into the singles main draw:
  Stefano Napolitano
  Riccardo Bellotti 
  Matteo Donati
  Stefano Travaglia

The following players received entry from the qualifying draw:
  Yoshihito Nishioka
  Zhang Ze
  Alberto Brizzi
  Gonzalo Lama

Doubles main-draw entrants

Seeds

1 Rankings as of May 19, 2014.

Other entrants
The following pairs received wildcards into the doubles main draw:
  Marco Cecchinato /  Flavio Cipolla
  Matteo Donati /  Edoardo Eremin
  Francesco Borgo /  Stefano Travaglia

Champions

Singles

 Filip Krajinović def.  Norbert Gomboš, 6–4, 6–4

Doubles

 Andrej Martin /  Igor Zelenay def.  Błażej Koniusz /  Mateusz Kowalczyk, 6–1, 7–5

External links

Internazionali di Tennis Citta di Vicenza
Internazionali di Tennis Città di Vicenza
AON